A daymark is a navigational aid for sailors and pilots, distinctively marked to maximize its visibility in daylight. 

The word is also used in a more specific, technical sense to refer to a signboard or daytime identifier that is attached to a day beacon or other aid to navigation. In that sense, a daymark conveys to the mariner during daylight hours the same significance as does the aid's light or reflector at night. Standard signboard shapes are square, triangular and rectangular; and the standard colours are red, green, orange, yellow and black.

Notable daymarks

 Trinity House Obelisk
 Kingswear Daymark
Tasku beacon tower
Keskiniemi beacon tower
Hiidenniemi beacon tower
Laitakari beacon tower
Herring Tower, Langness
Le Hocq
La Tour Cârrée
Scharhörnbake

Symbols used on US charts 
Chart symbols used by the US National Oceanic and Atmospheric Administration Department, 2013.

See also 

 Landmark
 Sea mark
 Lighthouse

References 

Navigational aids